The Cattle Breeding Centre was a veterinary research centre at Shinfield in the United Kingdom.

History
The site opened in February 1943 as the Reading Centre for the Artificial Insemination of Dairy Cattle. It had Shorthorn and Guernsey cattle. In January 1944 the site produced the world's first calf produced by artificial insemination, working with the Agricultural Improvement Council. Another site had been opened at Cambridge in November 1942.

The site closed in 1991.

Visits
On Thursday 15 November 1979, the site was visited by President General Suharto of Indonesia; the President had come to power in a coup in 1965, and the visit was attended by protestors from Reading University Amnesty International group. On Wednesday 29 October 1980, the site was visited by the second President of Botswana, Quett Masire.

Demolition
The site was demolished by the University of Reading and sold for housing (360 houses) in 2003.

Structure
The site was east of the A327, south of the M4, around a half-mile east of the former headquarters of Berkshire County Council. A short section of the National Cycle Network 50 runs east–west past the former site.

Function
The site worked with artificial insemination (AI) of cattle and pigs.

See also
 Former Meat Research Institute in North Somerset

References

1943 establishments in the United Kingdom
1991 disestablishments in the United Kingdom
Agricultural research institutes in the United Kingdom
Animal breeding organizations
Artificial insemination
Buildings and structures of the University of Reading
Cattle breeding
Cattle in the United Kingdom
Dairy farming in the United Kingdom
Former research institutes
Education in the Borough of Wokingham
Research institutes established in 1943
Research institutes in Berkshire
Veterinary medicine in the United Kingdom
Veterinary research institutes
Buildings and structures demolished in 1991
Demolished buildings and structures in England